Phaguwala is a village located 19 kilometers east of the city of Sangrur and 40 kilometers from Patiala on NH-7 in the district of Sangrur in state of Punjab, India. It is an Historical Village because Shree Guru Teg Bhadhur Ji visited here and Nauvi Patsahi Guru Teg Bhadhur ji Gurudwara Sahib also established on Sunam-Bhawanigarh Road.  

Heath Institutions : PGIMER Ghabdha , Rehabilitation Centre Ghabdha,

Business Activities : will be updated soon .

Politics
Gram (Village) Panchayat of Phaguwala is the local body responsible for governing, developing, and managing the village. It includes Sarpanch and members. Now Phaguwala is divided into 9 wards and each member is elected from each ward.

Sarpanch : Karamjit Singh Ghuman 

Director of Cooperative Society : Karnail Singh Ghuman 

Youth Club Presedent : Jaspreet Singh Ghuman 

Phaguwala comes under Lok Sabha and Vidhan Sabha constituency seat of Sangrur.

Education

 Government Senior Secondary School - converted to smart school in 2019
 Satya Bharti School
Bhai Gurdas College of Polytechnics also situated to near this. 

Villages in Sangrur district